The 1909 New Mexico A&M Aggies football team was an American football team that represented New Mexico College of Agriculture and Mechanic Arts (now known as New Mexico State University) as an independent during the 1909 college football season. In their first year under head coach J. H. Squires, the Aggies compiled a 1–3–1 record. The team played its home games at Miller Field.

Schedule

References

New Mexico AandM
New Mexico State Aggies football seasons
New Mexico AandM Aggies football